Hindostan was launched at Whitby in 1819. She made one voyage, in 1821, transporting convicts to New South Wales. Later, she made two voyages transporting convicts to Van Diemen's Land, one with female convicts (1839), and one with male convicts (1840–1841). When not transporting convicts Hindostan was a general trader, sailing across the Atlantic, to India, and perhaps elsewhere as well. She was lost in 1841.

Career
Hindostan appeared in Lloyd's Register (LR) in 1820 with Williamson, master, Herring, owner, and trade London–Calcutta. She sailed to Calcutta on 25 January 1820 under a license from the British East India Company (EIC).

Next, the British government chartered Hindostan to carry convicts to New South Wales. Captain William Williamson sailed from Portsmouth on 29 July 1821 and arrived at Port Jackson on 24 November. She had embarked 152 male convicts, none of whom died during the voyage. She left for Madras in December.

In 1839 Hindostan carried convicts to Van Diemen's Land. Captain George Lamb sailed from London on 9 May 1839 and arrived at Hobart Town on 7 December. Hindostan had embarked 179 female convicts and she landed 178, having suffered one convict death en route.

In 1840–1841 Hindostan again carried convicts to Hobart Town. Captain Lamb sailed from London on 7 October 1840 and arrived at Port Jackson on 19 January 1841. Hindostan had embarked 209 male convicts, all of whom survived the voyage.

Fate
Hindostan foundered in the Atlantic Ocean on 27 August 1851. Nine of her sixteen crew went down with the ship. Survivors took to a boat and were rescued on 27 September by the schooner Martha Greenow. Hindostan was on a voyage from Whitby to Quebec City, Province of Canada, British North America.

Citations and references
Citations

References
 
 
  

1819 ships
Ships built in Whitby
Convict ships to New South Wales
Convict ships to Tasmania
Age of Sail merchant ships
Merchant ships of the United Kingdom
Maritime incidents in August 1851
Ships lost with all hands